Kilifi Bridge is the longest bridge in Kenya with a total length of 420 metres. The superstructure is a prestressed continuous box girder carrying two lanes. The bridge has three spans. The construction of Kilifi Bridge was completed in 1991.

It connects Kilifi and Mnarani. The road heads to Mombasa towards south, and Malindi, Lamu and Garissa towards north.

Cost
700million Ksh

Panoramic view

References

 
Box girder bridges
Bridges completed in 1991
Bridges in Kenya
Coast Province
1991 establishments in Kenya